Search the City was an American alternative and punk band from Detroit, Michigan who released two EPs and two studio albums.

Background 
The band is the brainchild of founding members Alex Sheldon (guitar) and Adam McMillion (drums) back in 2004. McMillion, who had recently graduated from Churchill High School in Michigan, met together in college and started playing together. The band was soon rounded out by the addition of Josh Frost (vocals), Jim Czech (guitar), and Eli Clark (bass).

In 2006, their debut EP Ghosts was released. They were signed to Tooth & Nail Records and released their new debut album A Fire So Big the Heavens Can See It on April 1, 2008. A Fire So Big the Heavens Can See It charted at No. 46 on the Billboard Top Christian Albums chart.

On June 19, 2012, the band released a YouTube video called "Search the City is alive!" in which the band announced a new demo, released on June 27 and a band member change, introducing 21-year-old Travis Bobier (originally from the band Aria Aesthetic) as the new vocalist of the band, taking the place of former vocalist Josh Frost, Chris Jenkins replacing former drummer Adam McMillion, and Joe Marks taking a permanent place of former full-time bassist Jim Baird, and bassists Eli Clark and Brandon James Ellis.

Original vocalist, Josh Frost, has begun work on his first solo project Kodiak Jack as well as opening up a recording studio called The Elephant Room, and in 2014, opened a second location in Nashville, Tenn., run by longtime friend Josh Colby.

Their second album, Flight, was released on September 3, 2013. Four singles were released from this album: "Light the Fire", "Watch the Stars Fall", "Whispers & Memories" and "One Last Lullaby" including three more singles: "The Runaways", "Heartstrings" and Rewrite the Ending".

Past members
 Josh Frost - vocals
 James “Jimmy Fullblast” Czech - Guitar
 Alex Sheldon - Guitar
 Andy Paonessa - Guitar, backing vocals
 Adam Mcmillion - Drums, backing vocals
 Jim Baird - Bass guitar
 Brandon James Ellis - Bass guitar, backing vocals
 Travis Bobier - Vocals
 Eli Clark - Bass guitar
 Chris Jenkins - Drums
 Joe Marks - Bass

Discography 
 Ghosts — 2006 EP
 A Fire So Big the Heavens Can See It — 2008
 Demos — 2012 EP
 Flight — 2013

Albums 
Ghosts EP
 This Is Your Captain Speaking
 Mays Funeral
 We Get Along Like A House On Fire
 The Holiday Song
 Streetlight Diaries 
Clocks and Timepieces

A Fire So Big the Heavens Can See It
 Son of a Gun
 To The Moon For All I Care
 Detroit Was Built on Secrets
 Ambulance Chaser
 Talk Is Cheap and I've Got Expensive Taste
 The Rescue
 Bigger Scars Make Better Stories
 The Streetlight Diaries
 In This Scene You're Just an Extra
 Clocks and Timepieces

Flight
 My Secrets Have Secrets Too
 Syndicated Reality
 Heartstrings
 Whispers and Memories
 The Runaways
 Young Hearts
 Light the Fire
 A Beautiful Mess
 Rewrite the Ending
 One Last Lullaby
 Get A Grip
 Watch the Stars Fall

Singles

References 

Alternative rock groups from Michigan
Indie rock musical groups from Michigan
Tooth & Nail Records artists
Musical groups from Detroit
2006 establishments in Michigan
Musical groups established in 2006